Bora Diya Pokuna is a 2015 Sri Lankan Sinhala adult drama film directed by Sathyajith Maitipe and produced by Sunil Dharmasiri. It stars Kaushalya Fernando and Dilani Abeywardana in lead roles along with Priyanka Samaraweera and Duminda de Silva. Music composed by Pradeep Ratnayaka. It is the 1222nd Sri Lankan film in the Sinhala cinema.

The film was screened at Smithsonian Institution in Washington on 5 December 2004. The film production was completed in 2003, but banned by the Public Performance Board of Sri Lanka, until it was granted in 2010 for showing in 2015. The film won a special prize for the Best Fiction Film at Honolulu International Film festival, 2005 in Hawaii.

Cast
 Kaushalya Fernando as Ariyalatha / Gothami
 Dilani Abeywardana as Mangala
 Duminda de Silva as Vipula
 Priyanka Samaraweera as Suwineetha
 Dharmasiri Bandaranayake as Desmond
 Veena Jayakody as Doreen
 Rathnawali Kekunawela as Bording mistress
 Rohitha Karunarathna as Sanjeewa
 Chandani Seneviratne as Piyasili
 Leonie Kotelawala as Gothami' mother
 Chandra Kaluarachchi as Desmond's mother
 Gayan Lakruwan as Suranjith
 Pramudi Karunaratne as Taniya
 Sarath Kothalawala
 Nilmini Buwaneka
 Asela Jayakody
 Giriraj Kaushalya
 Jayani Senanayake

References

2015 films
2010s Sinhala-language films
2015 drama films
Sri Lankan drama films